William Acton (1513 – 1567) of Aldenham in Shropshire was an English politician who served in Parliament.

Career
Acton sat in two of Queen Mary's five Parliaments for Bridgnorth in Shropshire in April 1554 and 1555. Both times he was a Member of Parliament together with his distant kinsman, Jerome Horde. Acton joined Reginald Corbet and others from Shropshire in opposing a government bill in 1555.

Acton came from a family of lawyers.  His eldest son may have studied law, but it's not known if Acton obtained a legal education. Acton had a close connection to Reginald Corbet and Roger Smith, Corbet helped Acton's son admission to the Middle Temple in 1552. Smith, related to Acton by marriage, promoted him from Bridgnorth in the two Edwardian Parliaments.

Personal
Acton was the only surviving son of Thomas Acton and Elizabeth Dryland.  Acton married Cecily Cresset, daughter of Richard Cresset of Upton Cressett in Shropshire, by 1534. Acton died on 7 May 1567 and was succeeded by his son Robert.

Family
Acton had the following descendants:
 Robert Acton (1534-1597), grandfather of Sir Edward Acton, 1st Baronet (1600–1659)
 Richard Acton of London, mercer, married 1571 Margaret Daniel and had a son Sir William Acton, 1st and last Baronet (died 1651)
 Frances Acton (died 1577), married 1563 John Billingsley (1535-74), eldest son of William Billingsley and had children
 Rev Thomas Acton (died Jan 1615/6), vicar of Chelmarsh, Shropshire 1598-1616
 Roland Acton (died 1583), mercer, died unmarried
 Rev John Acton (1554-1624), rector of Wheathill, Shropshire, married 1594 Anne (Agnes) Head (died 1621) and had a daughter
 Francis Acton (died 1623), m. Bridget Powys, and had a son named Francis
 Mary Acton, married Humphrey Eaton, rector of Thornton, Herefordshire
 Elizabeth Acton (died after 1611), married  1584 Adam Doddington alias Detton (died 1611), son of Robert Detton and had children
 Jane Acton, married before 1575 Thomas Oseley
 Dorothy Acton, married John Jones
 Anne Acton, married John Stringer

References

English MPs 1554
English MPs 1555
Year of birth uncertain
1513 births
1567 deaths
Politicians from Shropshire